シャンティ (Shanti) is the second studio album from Japanese singer Hitomi Shimatani. It was released on June 12, 2002, and hit #1 on the Oricon charts. Since then, it was last recorded as having sold around 438,447 copies. Thus far, it is her highest-selling studio album, and her only one to top the Oricon weekly charts.

The album also contains 亜麻色の髪の乙女, Shimatani's highest-selling single to date with 375,000 copies sold.

Track listing
 Introduction
 Shanti
 Amairo no Kami no Otome, The Girl with the Flaxen Hair)
 Glorious Day
 Interlude
 A.S.A.P.: As Soon As Possible
 She Is...
 Remember of You
 Interlude
 Yasashii Kiss no Mitsukekata (Yasashii Kiss no Mitsukekata, How to Find an Affectionate Kiss)
 Freeze: 失われた夏の日 (ushiruwaneta natsu no hi, The Summer Day We Lost)
 Hello!
 Beloved
 Yasashii Kiss no Mitsukekata
 Colors
 亜麻色の髪の乙女: Hiro Kuretani Remix
 Single Hits Non-stop Mega Mix: Trans Mission Mega Mix (First Press Bonus Track)

Hitomi Shimatani albums
2002 albums